Uplawmoor railway station was a railway station near the village of Uplawmoor, East Renfrewshire, Scotland. The station was originally part of the Glasgow, Barrhead and Kilmarnock Joint Railway.

History
The station opened on 27 March 1871 as Caldwell. The station spent most of its existence as this name, and was only renamed to Uplawmoor upon the closure of the station with the same name on the Lanarkshire and Ayrshire Railway on 2 April 1962. The station closed permanently on 7 November 1966.

The Neilston Curling Club members enjoyed concessions granted by the Glasgow, Barrhead and Kilmarnock Joint Railway Company for members and their curling stones to travel between Neilston and Caldwell stations and return for the cost of the single journey. A key for the club's Curling house was also kept at the then Caldwell station.

In 1966 the station was temporarily renamed 'Tannochbrae' for an episode of Dr. Finlay's Casebook. BR Class J36 0-6-0 steam locomotive No. 65345 was repainted at Thornton m.p.d. for use in the filming.

Today the line is still open as part of the Glasgow South Western Line, with the original station building still standing as a private residence. Many local campaigns to re-open the station have come and gone without success.

References

Notes

Sources
 
 

Disused railway stations in East Renfrewshire
Railway stations in Great Britain opened in 1871
Railway stations in Great Britain closed in 1966
Beeching closures in Scotland
Former Glasgow, Barrhead and Kilmarnock Joint Railway stations